Qadian (also Romanized as Qādīān) is a village in Zaz-e Sharqi Rural District, Zaz va Mahru District, Aligudarz County, Lorestan Province, Iran. At the 2006 census, its population was 389, in 58 families.

References 

Towns and villages in Aligudarz County